La Haute-Yamaska (meaning The Upper Yamaska) is a regional county municipality in the Estrie region of Quebec, Canada. Its seat is Granby.

It is named for its position at the height of the Yamaska River, which cuts through its southern part. It rises at Brome Lake located in neighbouring Brome-Missisquoi Regional County Municipality.

On January 1, 2010, the city of Bromont left La Haute-Yamaska; it was reclassified to the Brome-Missisquoi RCM.

In 2021, it was transferred to the Estrie region from Montérégie.

Subdivisions
There are 8 subdivisions within the RCM:

Cities & Towns (2)
 Granby
 Waterloo

Municipalities (4)
 Roxton Pond
 Saint-Alphonse-de-Granby
 Saint-Joachim-de-Shefford
 Sainte-Cécile-de-Milton

Townships (1)
 Shefford

Villages (1)
 Warden

Demographics 
Mother tongue from Canada 2021 Census

Highways
Highways and numbered routes that run through the municipality, including external routes that start or finish at the county border:

 Autoroutes
 

 Principal Highways
 
 
 

 Secondary Highways
 
 
 

 External Routes
 None

References 

 
Census divisions of Quebec